Joe Shakespeare (1883–1935) was a rugby league footballer in the New South Wales Rugby League(NSWRL)'s foundation season of 1908.

Joseph Shakespear played for the Eastern Suburbs club. He was also a boxing promoter, referee, and an Alderman at Cessnock, New South Wales.

References

 The Eastern Suburbs club website

Australian rugby league players
Sydney Roosters players
1883 births
1935 deaths
Place of birth missing